Catastia marginea is a moth of the family Pyralidae. It was described by Michael Denis and Ignaz Schiffermüller in 1775 and is found in northern and central Europe and eastwards through Russia.

The wingspan is 20–22 mm.

The larva probably feed on Alchemilla vulgaris and Potentilla

References

External links
 Swedish Butterflies and Moths

Moths described in 1775
Phycitini
Moths of Europe
Moths of Asia